John Paul "Bucky" Pizzarelli (January 9, 1926 – April 1, 2020) was an American jazz guitarist. 
 
He was the father of jazz guitarist John Pizzarelli and double bassist Martin Pizzarelli. He worked for NBC as a staffman for Dick Cavett (1971) and ABC with Bobby Rosengarden in (1952). Musicians he collaborated with include Benny Goodman, George Barnes, Les Paul, Stéphane Grappelli, and Antônio Carlos Jobim. Pizzarelli cited as influences Django Reinhardt, Freddie Green, and George Van Eps.

Early life
Pizzarelli was born on January 9, 1926, in Paterson, New Jersey, United States. He learned to play guitar and banjo at a young age. His uncles, Pete and Bobby Domenick, were professional musicians, and sometimes the extended family would gather at one of their homes with their guitars for jam sessions. Pizzarelli cited blind accordion player Joe Mooney as an inspiration. Mooney led a quartet that included Pizzarelli's uncle, Bobby Domenick. During high school, Pizzarelli was the guitarist for a small band that performed classical music.

Career
Pizzarelli began his professional career at 17 when he joined the Vaughn Monroe dance band in 1944.

In 1951, he did his first recording as a sideman outside the Monroe orchestra with Joe Mooney.

In 1952 Pizzarelli became a staff musician for NBC, playing with Skitch Henderson. In 1964, he became a member of The Tonight Show Band on The Tonight Show Starring Johnny Carson. During his time spent performing for the Tonight Show, he accompanied guest bands and musicians playing through a variety of musical genres, including playing with Tiny Tim (after tuning the performer's ukulele) on the day that Tiny Tim married Miss Vicki on Carson's show.

From 1956 to 1957, Pizzarelli used the stage name "Johnny Buck" and performed with The Three Suns pop music trio. During the following year, he and guitarist George Barnes formed a duo and recorded two albums, including a live performance in August 1971, at The Town Hall in New York City. Beginning in the 1970s, he began recording as a leader, issuing many tributes to musicians of the 1930s. He toured several times with Benny Goodman until Goodman's death in 1986. He performed with Benny Goodman at the White House in Washington, D.C., and he performed for presidents Ronald Reagan, Bill Clinton, and First Lady Pat Nixon.

"Jersey Jazz Guitars" was the name of a 1985 concert held at the Rutgers University Nicholas Music Center in New Brunswick, New Jersey. The ticket featured Pizzarelli, Les Paul, Tal Farlow, and Pizzarelli's son, John. The concert was aired on New Jersey's public radio station as part of their three-part New Jersey Summerfare Series. Pizzarelli and Les Paul had performed together before, as they were neighbors and friends. The show aired for one hour in August 1985, with son John adding his vocals on two selections.

Pizzarelli continued to play into his 90s, making several appearances even after a stroke in 2016, officially retiring after a final brief appearance with Michael Feinstein in 2018. He died of COVID-19 on April 1, 2020, in Saddle River, New Jersey. He had been battling several serious health problems in recent years.

Guitars
Pizzarelli's first guitar was an archtop Gibson, an expensive instrument at the time. Since his first professional assignment with Vaughn Monroe, he favoured 1930s and 1940s Epiphone DeLuxe models and used them throughout his career for six-string, rhythm guitar work – as notably heard on his 2007 record "Five For Freddie: Bucky Pizzarelli's Tribute To Freddie Green". Inspired by George Van Eps, in 1969 he started playing the seven-string guitar. In later years he owned and used a vast range of guitars but was mostly seen playing a  Benedetto Bucky Pizzarelli Signature made by Robert Benedetto, who also makes guitars for Howard Alden and Frank Vignola. The extra string on Pizzarelli's guitar provided him with a bass line during performances. Pizzarelli also played a custom seven-string American archtop guitar made by luthier Dale Unger, who also makes custom guitars for Pizzarelli's partner, Ed Laub.

Collaborations 
With Sarah Vaughan
 The Duke Ellington Songbook, Vol. 1 (Pablo, 1980)
 The Duke Ellington Songbook, Vol. 2 (Pablo, 1980)

With Robert Palmer
 Ridin' High (EMI, 1992)

With Carly Simon
 Hotcakes (Elektra Records, 1974)

With Michael Franks
 Tiger in the Rain (Warner Bros. Records, 1979)

With Aretha Franklin
 The Electrifying Aretha Franklin (Columbia Records, 1962)
 The Tender, the Moving, the Swinging Aretha Franklin (Columbia Records, 1962)

With Janis Ian
 Aftertones (Columbia Records, 1975)

With Dion DiMucci
 Runaround Sue (Laurie Records, 1961)

With Paul McCartney
 Kisses on the Bottom (Hear Music, 2012)

With Judy Collins
 True Stories and Other Dreams (Elektra Records, 1973)

With Rosemary Clooney
 Do You Miss New York? (Concord Records, 1993)

With Solomon Burke
 Solomon Burke (Apollo Records, 1962)

With Anita Baker
 Rhythm of Love (Elektra Records, 1994)

With Neil Sedaka
 A Song (Elektra Records, 1977)

With Roberta Flack
 First Take (Atlantic Records, 1969)

With Tony Mottola
 Lush, Latin & Lovely (Project 3, 1967)

Personal life and death
Pizzarelli married Ruth (née Litchult) in 1954. His son John is a jazz guitarist and vocalist and his son Martin is a professional bassist who has recorded with his father and brother. His daughter Mary is a classical guitarist who appeared on her father's third album as a leader, Green Guitar Blues, as well as on other recordings. Pizzarelli also appeared on three albums of his daughter-in-law (John's wife), Jessica Molaskey. He died on April 1, 2020, from complications of COVID-19.

Awards and honors
 Lifetime Achievement Award, MAC Awards, 2002
 Jazz Wall of Fame, ASCAP, 2005
 New Jersey Hall of Fame, 2011

Discography

References

External links
 
 Bucky Pizzarelli at NPR Music
 Bucky Pizzarelli Interview for NAMM Oral History Program
 

1926 births
2020 deaths
20th-century American guitarists
20th-century American male musicians
United States Army personnel of World War II
American jazz guitarists
American male guitarists
American people of Italian descent
Challenge Records artists
Chesky Records artists
Guitarists from New Jersey
American male jazz musicians
Military personnel from New Jersey
Musicians from Paterson, New Jersey
Savoy Records artists
Seven-string guitarists
Statesmen of Jazz members
Swing guitarists
The Tonight Show Band members
Deaths from the COVID-19 pandemic in New Jersey
21st-century American guitarists
21st-century American male musicians
Arbors Records artists